Rising Lands is a fantasy-based real-time strategy computer game developed by Microïds, released in 1997.

Rising Lands takes place in a not too distant future, where earth has been devastated by a comet. The survivors have formed small tribes, and as the leader of one of these tribes, the player's mission is to guide their people to become rulers of the post-apocalyptic earth.

Gameplay is similar to most real-time strategy games. The player collects three different resources (food, stones and metal) and must utilize these to build new buildings, create armies, increase population and research new technologies.

External links
Microïds website

Microïds games
1997 video games
Multiplayer and single-player video games
Windows games
Windows-only games
Real-time strategy video games
Video games developed in France